WTYG is a Christian radio station licensed to Sparr, Florida, broadcasting on 91.5 MHz FM.  WTYG is owned by Central Baptist Church of Ocala Inc.

WTYG is also heard in Ocala, Florida at 107.1 through translator W296CW.

References

External links
WTYG's website

TYG